The UC Davis Aggies (also referred to as the Ags, Cal Aggies, or Aggies) are the athletic teams that represent the University of California, Davis.

Seventeen of the school's 25 intercollegiate sports - baseball, men's basketball, men's cross country, men's golf, men's soccer, men's tennis, men's track & field, softball, women's basketball, women's beach volleyball, women's cross country, women's golf, women's soccer, women's tennis, women's track & field, women's volleyball and women's water polo - compete in the Big West Conference.

The Aggies' football team compete in Division I Football Championship Subdivision (FCS) (formerly known as Division I-AA), and are members of the Big Sky Conference, granting UC Davis the distinction of being one of only three UC campuses to field a football team (Cal and UCLA being the other two).

The Aggies are also members of the Mountain Pacific Sports Federation in women's indoor track and field, women's gymnastics, and women's swimming and diving, the America East Conference in field hockey, the Eastern College Athletic Conference for equestrian and the Western Water Polo Association for men's water polo. The Aggies women's lacrosse team will join the Pac-12 Conference as an affiliate member.

Nickname
The "Aggies" is UC Davis' official team nickname. This reflects the school's previous name, College of Agriculture at Davis.

History

Origins (1915–1959) 
Davis began its athletics program with football in 1915 as part of the University of California team.

Division II (1990–2003)
The Aggies finished first in NCAA Division II six times in 2003 and won the NACDA Director's Cup four years in a row from 1999 to 2003. In 1998, the UC Davis men's basketball team won the NCAA Division II Men's Basketball Championship, despite being one of the few non-scholarship institutions in Division II at that time.

UC Davis also won NCAA Division II championships in softball (2003), men's tennis (1992), and women's tennis (1990, 1993).

Division I (2004–present)
The Aggies' achievements in Division II motivated a decision (following a year of heavy discussion by campus administrators, faculty, staff, students, alumni and the local community) in 2003 for the athletics program to reclassify to Division I. The department became a full-fledged D-I program on July 1, 2007.

Sports sponsored

Baseball

The UC Davis Aggies baseball team is the varsity intercollegiate athletic baseball team of the University of California, Davis. The team is a member of the Big West Conference, which is part of the NCAA Division I. The team plays its home games at Phil Swimley Field at the 3,500-seat Dobbins Stadium.

Former Stanford and Texas assistant coach Tommy Nicholson was hired as the 11th head coach in program history on December 11, 2021.

Basketball

Men's basketball

The school's team currently competes in the Big West Conference, which is part of the NCAA Division I. UC Davis' first men's basketball team was fielded during the 1910–11 season. UC Davis won an NCAA Division II national championship in 1998 and had 12 postseason appearances. The team plays its home games at a 7,600-seat arena called University Credit Union Center.

The 2022-23 season is head coach Jim Les 12th with the program. During his tenure with the Aggies, the men's basketball team earned its inaugural Big West championship and first NCAA Division I men's basketball tournament appearance in 2017. Les, along with associate head coach Kevin Nosek and assistant coaches Jonathan Metzger-Jones and Kyle Vogt entered their seventh season together in 2022-23.

Women's basketball

Following a successful stint as an NCAA Division II program, the UC Davis women's basketball team began its transition to the NCAA Division I level in 2003–04, officially competing as a member of the Big West Conference in 2007–08.The team plays its home games at a 7,600-seat arena called University Credit Union Center.

The Aggies have won six Big West Conference regular season titles (2009–10, 2016–17, 2017–18, 2018–19, 2019–20, 2020-21) and three Big West Tournament titles (2011, 2019, 2021) in their combined 15 Division I seasons. UC Davis is one of three schools in league history to win at least four consecutive Big West regular season titles, joining UC Santa Barbara (1996–2005) and Long Beach State (1985–1989). The Aggies have advanced to the NCAA Tournament three times in 2011, 2019 and 2021 as the automatic qualifier from the Big West Conference and has earned five berths to the WNIT, including an "Elite Eight" appearance in 2018 and a "Sweet 16" appearance in 2017.

Football

The UC Davis Aggies football team represents UC Davis in the NCAA Division I Football Championship Subdivision (FCS). The football program's first season took place in 1915 and has fielded a team each year since with the exception of 1918 during World War I and from 1943 to 1945 during World War II, when the campus, then known as the University Farm, was shut down. The team plays its home games at the 10,473-seat UC Davis Health Stadium.

UC Davis competed as a member of the NCAA College Division through 1972; from 1973 to 2003, the Aggies competed as an NCAA Division II program. In 2004, UC Davis promoted its football program to the Division I FCS (then I-AA) level and joined the Great West Conference (then known as the Great West Football Conference) after one season as an independent team with exploratory status. After their provisional seasons and the construction of a new stadium, UC Davis became a full member of Division I in 2007 and eligible for the postseason.

Throughout its history, the football program won 31 conference championships. Between 1929 and 1992, the Aggies captured 27 outright or shared Northern California Athletic Conference championships, including 20 in a row from 1971 to 1990, an American West Conference title in 1993 (co-champion), and GWFC/GWC championships in 2005 (co-champ) and 2009. The Aggies won their first football title as a Division I program in 2018 as one of the Big Sky Conference's three regular season champions.

Men's soccer

The UC Davis Aggies men's soccer team have an NCAA Division I Tournament record of 1–3 through three appearances.

Men's water polo

The UC Davis Aggies men's water polo team have an NCAA Division I Tournament record of 1-7 through eight appearances.

Championships

Team championships
UC Davis has not won a national championship at the NCAA Division I level, but previously won eight national championships at the NCAA Division II level.

NCAA Division II National Championships
 Men's basketball: 1998
 Men's golf: 1979
 Women's rowing: 2002, 2003
 Softball: 2003
 Men's tennis: 1992
 Women's tennis: 1990, 1993

Non-NCAA National Championships
 Women's gymnastics – Division III: 1981 (AIAW)
 Women's tennis – Division III: 1980, 1981 (AIAW)

Team tournament appearances

NCAA
Baseball (1): 2008
Men's basketball (1): 2017
Women's basketball (3): 2011, 2019, 2021
Football (2): 2018, 2021
Women's golf (4): 2008, 2011, 2013, 2015
Women's gymnastics (2): 1998, 2014
Men's soccer (3): 2007, 2008, 2019
Softball (1): 2010
Men's outdoor track and field (2): 1941, 1974
Women's indoor track and field (1): 2019
Women's outdoor track and field (6): 2012, 2013, 2015, 2017, 2018, 2019
Men's water polo (7): 1974, 1975, 1996, 1997, 2016, 2017, 2019
Women's water polo (3): 2006, 2008, 2015

Individual championships
At the NCAA Division II level, UC Davis garnered 72 individual championships.

Athletic facilities
Aggie Field Hockey Facility – field hockey
Aggie Soccer Field – men's and women's soccer
Edwards Family Athletics Center
Hickey Gymnasium – administrative offices and basketball, gymnastics, volleyball practice centers
La Rue Field – softball
Marya Welch Tennis Center – men's and women's tennis
University Credit Union Center – men's and women's basketball, women's gymnastics, women's volleyball
Phil Swimley Field at Dobbins Stadium – baseball
Schaal Aquatics Center – women's swimming and diving, men's and women's water polo
Toomey Weight Room
UC Davis Health Stadium – football and lacrosse
UC Davis Beach Volleyball Courts – women's beach volleyball
Woody Wilson Track at Toomey Field  – men's and women's outdoor track and field

Traditions

Colors, mascot, and spirit
The official school colors are blue and gold. The blue is due to the UC's early connection to Yale and as a result was referred to as "Yale Blue", but UC Davis' official blue, usually called "Aggie Blue", Pantone 295 differs from Yale Blue (approximately Pantone 289).

The official school mascot is a mustang named Gunrock. The name dates to 1921 when the US Army brought a horse named Gun Rock to UC Davis to supply high-quality stock for cavalry horses; the mustang mascot was selected to honor that cavalry horse. Students at UC Davis are referred to as Aggies in honor of the school's agricultural heritage. Unlike most colleges, there is a distinction between the name for students and the mascot. There was a movement to change the school's mascot from the mustang to the cow, but despite student support this was turned down after opposition from alumni.

UC Davis students gather at sporting events to rally as the Aggie Pack, the largest student-run school spirit organization in the United States, which supports its intercollegiate athletics teams to the music of the UC Davis Marching Band.

Rivalries
The highlight of the four-year transition to Division I occurred on September 17, 2005, when the Aggies football team defeated the heavily favored Stanford Cardinal at Stanford Stadium by a score of 20–17 on a touchdown pass with eight seconds left in the game. The Aggies also pulled off an upset against Stanford in basketball just months later, beating the Cardinal 64–58 with a late rally at home on December 4, 2005. Wins in these two major sports, with the addition of victories against the Cardinal in soccer, wrestling and two wins in baseball pulled the Aggies' men's sports' win–loss record against Stanford to 5–1 for the 2005–06 season.

Aggie football plays Sacramento State in the annual Causeway Classic for a trophy made from Yolo Causeway cement (formerly the Causeway Carriage). The Causeway Classic is part of a larger competition, the Causeway Cup, that tracks head-to-head meetings between the schools' common intercollegiate athletics programs.

The football team also faces Cal Poly in the annual Battle for the Golden Horseshoe.

Former varsity sports 
On April 20, 2010, the school announced that four sports, women's rowing, men's swimming and diving, men's indoor track and field, and wrestling, would be eliminated due to a financial crisis and cuts in state funding.

Prior to 2010, the last time UC Davis had discontinued a sport was men's gymnastics in 1987.

Non-varsity sports

Rugby
Colby "Babe" Slater, won gold medals with the U.S. rugby national team at the 1920 and 1924 Olympics, and was captain of the 1924 team.

The UC Davis Aggies won the men's 2015 DI-AA college rugby championship by defeating Central Florida in the final 18–15 at Kennesaw State University's Fifth Third Bank Stadium. The men repeated as the 2016 D1-AA as national champions by defeating the Notre Dame College of South Euclid, Ohio, in the final by a score of 17–13.

The UC Davis Aggies won the women's 2016 D1 college rugby national championship by defeating the University of Virginia, 30–25, at Saint Mary's College in Moraga, California.

Club national team championships
 Co-ed archery (1): 2015 (USA Archery)
 Men's archery (1): 2016 (USA Archery)
 Women's archery (1): 2016 (USA Archery)
 Men's boxing (1): 2013 (USIBA)
 Co-ed cycling (4): 1994, 2001, 2006, 2009 (USA Cycling)
 Men's polo (2): 1975, 1979 (USPA)
 Men's rugby (2) – Division I-AA: 2015, 2016 (USA Rugby)
 Women's rugby – Division I (2): 2016, 2017 (USA Rugby)
 Women's ultimate (2): 1989, 2004 (USA Ultimate)
 Co-ed water skiing – Division II (1): 2013 (NCWSA)
Note: For sports with no division noted, the title was earned at the top-most level.

References

External links